The 2015 season was FC Goa's second season in existence in the Indian Super League.

Background
Brazil's No 10 Zico returned as FC Goa manager for the Indian Super League's second season. Former Brazil skipper and World Cup winner Lucio has signed up as FC Goa's marquee player for the second season. Players retained in the team include- Domestic: Romeo Fernandes, Mandar Rao Desai, Laxmikant Kattimani, Narayan Das, Debabrata Roy, Bikramjit Singh. International: Gregory Arnolin (FRA). Players from the open market include- Domestic: Pronay Halder, C S Sabeeth, Denson Devadas, Joaquim Abranches, Raju Gaikwad, Keenan Almeida, Nicolau Colaco, Luis Barreto. International: Jofre Mateu González (ESP), Lucio (BRA), Elinton Andrade (BRA), Reinaldo Da Cruz Oliveira (BRA), Victor Simões de Oliveira (BRA), Jonatan Lucca (BRA), Léo Moura (BRA). Players selected from draft include forwards Victorino Fernandes and Thongkhosiem Haokip.

FC Goa will play its opening match on its home turf on 4 October with the Delhi Dynamos FC.

Season Summary

4 October: FC Goa rode on two first half goals
scored by Mandar Rao Dessai (3’) and
Reinaldo da Cruz Oliveira (45+3’) to beat Delhi
Dynamos FC in their opening fixture of the
league stage that began with three back to
back matches at their home fortress.
7 October: FC Goa came back brilliantly to
hold Atletico de Kokata to a 1–1 draw as
Keenan Almeida (82’) scored a stunner after
Arata Izumi (13’) had given Antonio Lopes
Habas’ side the lead in a fiery tie that saw the
sending off of Baljit Sahni (62’).
11 October: A result to forget was the first
defeat in this season. FC Goa went down to
4–0 defeat at the hands of Chennaiyin FC in
Match 9 where Elano Blumer, who scored in
the 43rd minute, assisted two of Stiven
Mendoza’s goals in the Colombian’s hat-trick
(10’, 63’, 75’).
15 October: The Gaurs got their ISL campaign
back on track with an emphatic 3–1 victory
over NorthEast United FC at the Indira Gandhi
Athletic Stadium in Guwahati. After Francis
Dadzie scored the 12th-minute opener,
Jonatan Lucca (27’), Reinaldo (30’) and
Mandar (70’) completed the comeback for FC
Goa.
22 October: FC Goa came from behind once
again and reclaimed the top spot with a 2–1
win over Kerala Blasters FC as Leo Moura
(45+1’) cancelled Mohammed Rafi’s 24th-minute lead while Gregory Arnolin sealed the
victory in the 84th minute.
25 October: The winning run came to a halt
after Mumbai City FC registered a 2–0 win
over the league leaders in Mumbai. In what
was FC Goa striker Darryl Duffy’s last match of
the season where the Scot was ruled out due
to a hairline fracture, Sunil Chhetri’s penalty
(33’) and Frederic Piquonne’s header (49’)
were enough to give the home team all three
points.
30 October: The Virat Kohli co-owned FC Goa
remained afloat in the top half with a 1–1
draw against FC Pune City in which an own
goal scored by Roger Johnson (46’) was
cancelled by Eugeneson Lyngdoh in the 64th
minute.
5 November: FC Goa gifted Virat Kohli with a
2–0 win over Chennaiyin FC. On his debut,
Rafael Coelho Luiz won both the penalties that
were converted by Leo Moura (64’) and
Jonatan Lucca (78’) as the Gaurs recorded
their second away win of the season.
Harmanjot Khabra was sent off in the 89th
minute wherein the Chennaiyin player put his
studs on Moura’s right leg.
8 November: As it almost looked as a win for
the league leaders, Adrian Mutu (90+4’)
handed the Goan franchise with a
heartbreaker at the death. In the thrilling round
nine clash, Eugeneson Lyngdoh had bagged
the opener in the 32nd minute. Rafael (34’)
and Jonatan Lucca (44’) brought FC Goa back
into the game but for the unthinkable to
happen at the last minute.
17 November: FC Goa hammered Mumbai City
FC 7–0 to record the biggest victory in the
history of the competition. Thongkhosiem
Haokip (34’, 52’, 79’) and Dudu Omagbemi
(42’, 64’, 67’) scored more than just their first
goals in FC Goa colours, with former bagging
the 100th goal in the ISL 2015, while Reinaldo
(90’) scored his third of the season.
22 November: FC Goa have not only remained
winless against Atletico de Kolkata but also
lost 4–0 to the ISL 2014 champions. Sameehg
Doutie (20’, 78’), Borja Fernandez (22’) and
Iain Hume (68’) were the scorers for this
season’s semifinalists.
25 November: It was the last home match of
the season for FC Goa in the league stage
where Zico’s troops came from behind to hold
NorthEast United FC 1–1 and Leo Moura
bagged the "DHL winning pass" award for the
most number of assists (6, now 8) provided
for his side in the ISL this year. Victor
Mendy’s 56th-minute goal was cancelled by
Reinaldo in the 80th minute.
29 November: FC Goa blasted their way into
semifinals thrashing Kerala Blasters FC 5–1.
The Blasters’ second-minute lead scored by
Victor Herrero Forcada was annulled by Jofre
Mateu Gonzalez in the 12th minute. The Gaurs
also had their third hat-trick hero in Reinaldo
da Cruz Oliveira (29’, 50’, 61’) while Mandar
Rao Dessai (64’) joined the party to ensure a
comfortable win. The home team had to play
the second half with 10 men following the
sending off of Josu Carrias.
6 December: Having already made it to the
final four, FC Goa rallied back from two goals
down at half-time to beat Delhi Dynamos FC
3–2 in an exciting clash and finished on top of
the standings at the end of the league stage,
drawing the same opponents in the
semifinals. Serginho Green (31’) and Adil Nabi
(40’) gave the Lions a 2–0 lead in the first half
but the away team scored three goals in the
second half via a brace scored by Romeo
Fernandes (68’, 69’) and Jofre Mateu
Gonzalez (90’) to snatch all three points.
11 December: FC Goa succumbed a 1–0 loss
to Delhi Dynamos FC in the first leg of the
semifinals in Delhi. Robin Singh’s 42nd-minute
goal made the difference as the two teams
headed into the second leg of the semifinals
in Goa on 15 December with the Delhi
franchise leading 1–0 on aggregate.
15 December: FC Goa scripted their maiden
final appearance crushing Delhi Dynamos FC
3–0 in the second leg of their semifinal. Jofre
Mateu Gonzalez (11’), Rafael Coelho Luiz (27’)
and Dudu Omagbemi (84’) were the
goalscoring heroes for the Goan franchise
who were backed by a deafening home
support. Adil Nabi was given the marching
orders by referee Pranjal Banerjee due to the
Delhi player’s indiscipline on the bench after
he was already substituted.

Pre Season Friendly

Transfers

In:

Out:

Players and Staff

Current squad

Injured

Current Technical Staff

Indian Super League

First round

League table

Results summary

Results by round

Matches

Finals

Final

Squad statistics

Appearances and goals

|-
|-
|colspan="14"|Players who left Goa due to injury during the season:

|}

Goal scorers

Disciplinary record

References

FC Goa seasons
Goa